Alfonso Ramírez Gutiérrez (born 31 July 1943) is a Mexican boxer. He competed at the 1964 Summer Olympics and the 1968 Summer Olympics.

References

External links
 

1943 births
Living people
Mexican male boxers
Olympic boxers of Mexico
Boxers at the 1964 Summer Olympics
Boxers at the 1968 Summer Olympics
Boxers at the 1967 Pan American Games
Pan American Games medalists in boxing
Pan American Games bronze medalists for Mexico
Boxers from Mexico City
Welterweight boxers
Medalists at the 1967 Pan American Games